Malayalam WordNet (പദശൃംഖല) is an on line WordNet created for Malayalam Language. Malayalam WordNet has been developed by the Department of Computer Science, Cochin University Of Science And Technology.

History 
The first WordNet to be created was the Princeton English WordNet. WordNet was created in the Cognitive Science Laboratory of Princeton University under the direction of professor G. A. Miller starting in 1985 . It was followed by EuroWordNet for European languages, based on Princeton WordNet. Hindi WordNet was the first Indian language WordNet to be created. It was developed by the Natural Language Processing group at the Center for Indian Language Technology. It was followed by IndoWordNet which was developed for 18 Indian Languages under the guidance of Dr. Pushpak Bhattacharya, Indian Institute of Technology Bombay. A WordNet for Malayalam language was developed as part of the IndoWordNet under the guidance of Dr. K.P. Soman and Dr. S. Rajendran at Amrita Vishwa Vidyapeetham, Coimbatore.

Features 
Malayalam WordNet is a crowd sourced project. IndoWordNet is publicly browsable, but it is not available to edit. Malayalam WordNet allows users to add data to the WordNet in a controlled crowd sourcing manner. Either a set of experts or users itself could review the entries added by other members which helps in maintaining consistent data throughout.

It also has a JSON and XML interfaces which helps the programmers to interact with the WordNet. It would be highly useful for the researchers, language experts as well as application developers.

Team Members 
Malayalam WordNet has been developed by the Department of Computer Science, Cochin University Of Science And Technology. The team is headed by Dr. Sumam Mary Idicula (Professor and Head, Department of Computer Science). The team also includes Drishya Gopinath and Varghese K. Aniyan

Relationships covered 
It gives information about the meaning of the word, position in ontology, an example sentence for the synset and the following relationships:
 Synsets/ Synonyms
 Hyponymy and hypernymy
 Holonymy
 Meronymy
 Antonyms

Release 
The alpha version of has been launched on Feb 1,2016. The final version is released on April, 2016.

References 
 IndoWordnet - Dr. Pushpak Bhattacharya
 DRAVIDIAN WORDNET -Dr.S.Rajendran

External links
 

Lexical semantics